Karen Lynn Clark (born April 9, 1972) is a Canadian Olympic medalist and former synchronized swimmer.

Career
Clark began synchronized swimming at age six. She won three silver medals in solo, duet and team at 1989 FINA World Junior Synchronised Swimming Championships As a member of Team Canada she would win silver in the team events at the 1991 World Aquatics Championships and 1994 World Aquatics Championships. She won a silver medal in the solo event at the 1995 Pan American Games. Her most notable achievement was winning a silver medal at the 1996 Summer Olympics in Atlanta with the Canadian team.

Honours
Clark was inducted into the Mississauga Sports Hall of Fame in 2004.

References

External links
 
 
 
 Alberta Sports Hall of Fame profile

1972 births
Living people
Swimmers from Montreal
Canadian synchronized swimmers
Olympic synchronized swimmers of Canada
Olympic medalists in synchronized swimming
Olympic silver medalists for Canada
Synchronized swimmers at the 1996 Summer Olympics
World Aquatics Championships medalists in synchronised swimming
Synchronized swimmers at the 1991 World Aquatics Championships
Pan American Games medalists in synchronized swimming
Pan American Games silver medalists for Canada
Synchronized swimmers at the 1995 Pan American Games
Medalists at the 1996 Summer Olympics
Medalists at the 1995 Pan American Games
20th-century Canadian women
21st-century Canadian women